The 2022 ATP Cup was the third and final edition of the ATP Cup, an international outdoor hard court men's team tennis tournament held by the Association of Tennis Professionals (ATP). The tournament was part of the 2022 ATP Tour.

Due to the uncertainties with the ongoing COVID-19 pandemic, it was held at the Ken Rosewall Arena and the Sydney Super Dome in Sydney, from 1 to 9 January 2022 with 16 teams. Canada won the tournament, defeating Spain 2–0 in the final.

On 7 August 2022, as a result of all three editions being very poorly attended and riddled with logistical issues, along with heavy financial losses, and disdain for the event from fans, players - particularly women's players - and officials, Tennis Australia announced that the ATP Cup would be shut down, to be replaced by a mixed-gender United Cup from 2023.

ATP ranking points

 Maximum 750 points for undefeated singles player, 250 points for doubles.

Entries
Fifteen countries qualified for the ATP Cup, based on the ATP ranking of its No. 1 singles player at the entry deadline on 2 December 2021, while host country Australia received a wild card.

Withdrawals
In November, Switzerland withdrew after world number 16 Roger Federer withdrew from the event due to his recovery from a knee injury. 

On 1 December, Spanish world number six Rafael Nadal declined to take part in the Cup, though Spain qualified with their next best singles player.

Austria initially qualified with world number 15 Dominic Thiem: however, Thiem declined to participate, while Dennis Novak withdrew due to being unable to travel to Australia on 29 December. Austria were withdrawn from the competition by ATP Cup officials, as the Cup rules require at least one player from each country to be ranked inside the top 250, whereas their next three players were not. Austria were replaced with France.

Serbian world number 1 Novak Djokovic withdrew on 29 December 2021 due to travel and logisitical issues, but Serbia remained at the ATP Cup as their next best ranked player Dušan Lajović met the entry criteria. 

Russia were originally to be represented by Andrey Rublev and Aslan Karatsev, but both withdrew on 29 December 2021.

Group stage 
The 16 teams were divided into four groups of four teams each in a round-robin format. The winners of each group will qualify for the semifinals.

Overview 
G = Group, T = Ties, M = Matches, S = Sets

 Two-way ties between teams in Group C broken by head-to-head records

Group A

Chile vs. Spain

Serbia vs. Norway

Norway vs. Spain

Serbia vs. Chile

Norway vs. Chile

Serbia vs. Spain

Group B

Russia vs. France

Italy vs Australia

Italy vs. France

Russia vs Australia

Russia vs. Italy

Australia vs. France

Group C 

 Two-way ties between teams broken by head-to-head records.

Canada vs. United States

Germany vs. Great Britain

Germany vs. United States

Canada vs. Great Britain

Great Britain vs. United States

Germany vs. Canada

Group D

Argentina vs. Georgia

Greece vs. Poland

Poland vs. Georgia

Greece vs. Argentina

Poland vs. Argentina

Greece vs. Georgia

Knockout stage

Bracket

Semifinals

Spain vs. Poland

Canada vs. Russia

Final

Spain vs. Canada

References

External links
Official website
Draw

2022
2022 ATP Tour
2022 in Australian tennis
January 2022 sports events in Australia